Mürsəlli (also, Myursali and Myursally) is a village and municipality in the Sabirabad Rayon of Azerbaijan.  It has a population of 1,456.

References 

Populated places in Sabirabad District